The saying Whom the gods would destroy, they first make mad, sometimes given in Latin as Quos Deus vult perdere, prius dementat (literally: Those whom God wishes to destroy, he first deprives of reason) or Quem Iuppiter vult perdere, dementat prius (literally: Those whom Jupiter wishes to destroy, he first deprives of reason) has been used in English literature since at least the 17th century.  Although sometimes falsely attributed to Euripides, the phrase does have classical Greek antecedents.

The phrase "Whom the gods would destroy they first make mad" first appears in exactly this form in the Reverend William Anderson Scott's book Daniel, a Model for Young Men (1854) and it later appears in Henry Wadsworth Longfellow's poem "The Masque of Pandora" (1875).

Classical origins
An early version of the phrase Whom the gods would destroy... appears in verses 620–623 of Sophocles’ play Antigone: "τὸ κακὸν δοκεῖν ποτ᾽ ἐσθλὸν τῷδ᾽ ἔμμεν' ὅτῳ φρένας θεὸς ἄγει πρὸς ἄταν" to mean that "evil appears as good in the minds of those whom god leads to destruction".

A form closer to the modern version is found in Procopius, Vandal Wars, I.19.25, "ὅς [θεός], ἡνίκα τι ἀνθρώπῳ συμβῆναι βουλεύηται φλαῦρον, τῷ λογισμὸν ἁψάμενος πρῶτον": "who [God], whenever He purposes that some adversity shall befall a man, touches first his reason".

17th- and 18th-century use
In the 17th century the phrase was used in the neo-Latin form "Quem Iuppiter vult perdere, dementat prius" (Whom Jupiter would ruin, he first makes mad); in a Christianized Greek version, "Iuppiter" was replaced by "Lord" as in "μωραίνει Κύριος ον βούλεται απολέσαι".

Benjamin Franklin quotes this phrase in his essay, "On Civil War," delivered to the Printer of the London Public Advertiser, August 25, 1768.

A prior Latin version is "Quos Deus vult perdere, prius dementat" (Life of Samuel Johnson, 1791) but this involves God, not 'the gods'.

Jean-Jacques Rousseau quotes this phrase in ”The Confessions”, in the form of ”Quos vult perdere Jupiter dementet” [Whom Jupiter destroys, he first make mad], authored in 1769 but published in 1782.

Modern usage
"Those whom the gods wish to destroy they first make mad" is quoted as a "heathen proverb" in Daniel, a Model for Young Men (1854) by Reverend William Anderson Scott (1813–85).

Brigham Young quoted the phrase in a discourse delivered on March 16, 1856, attributing it as an "ancient proverb".

Leo Tolstoy uses the latin sentence “Quos vult perdere dementat” in reference to Napoleon, closing the second chapter of the third book of his 1869 novel War and Peace.

In Fyodor Dostoyevsky's 1868 novel The Idiot, in a garbled account of the loss of 400 roubles in part 3 chapter 9, Lukyan Timofeich Lebedev tells Prince Lev Nikolayevich Myshkin "Truly, when God wishes to punish a man, he first deprives him of reason."

In American literature, the character of Prometheus speaks the phrase: Whom the gods would destroy they first make mad in the poem "The Masque of Pandora" (1875), by Henry Wadsworth Longfellow.

W. Somerset Maugham uses the phrase in his short story "Mackintosh" (1921), leaving the Latin as an untranslated warning from the protagonist: Quem deus vult perdere prius dementat.

Sri Lankan Sinhala Catholic priest Father Simon Gregory Perera, S. J. utilizes the phrase untranslated in reference to the belief of Portuguese colonialists that the loss of Sri Lanka to the Dutch was divine punishment.

This phrase was also used by British politician (and classicist) Enoch Powell in his 1968 speech on immigration commonly known as the "Rivers of Blood" speech.

Ian Fleming's James Bond appropriates the phrase to express a related meaning: "Those whom the gods wish to destroy, they first make bored" in Chapter 11 of From Russia With Love.

First airing in early 1969, the original series Star Trek episode Whom Gods Destroy depicted the psychotic descent of a formerly brilliant Star Fleet commander.

The 1988 Marvel Graphic Novel, The Mighty Thor: I, Whom the Gods Would Destroy, starring Thor, is named after this quote.

The first episode in series 1 of Lewis is titled "Whom the Gods would Destroy" and the full quote is used in the episode by one of the characters.

In Season 2 Episode 8 of the TV series BARNEY MILLER, the phrase is spoken by Captain Miller at the end of the episode.

References

External links 
Similar quotes misattributed to Euripides at Wikiquote
Enoch Powell's 'Rivers of Blood' speech at The Telegraph, unedited since 12 December 2007

Henry Wadsworth Longfellow
Quotations from literature
19th-century neologisms